Ivan Smiljanić may refer to:

Ivan Smiljanić (rower), Serbian rower
Ivan Smiljanić (basketball), Serbian basketball player
Ivan Smiljanić (basketball, born 1971), Serbian basketball coach